Ichibata Electric Railway Co., Ltd. is the name of two related, yet different companies in Shimane Prefecture, Japan.  was a railway operator until 2006, when it became a holding company of the Ichibata Group, spinning off its railway division to its newly founded . Although the two companies have different names in Japanese, in English they are referred to by the English name of their parent holding company.

The company name is often shortened to Bataden.

Lines
Kita-Matsue Line:  line between Dentetsu Izumoshi Station and Matsue Shinjiko-Onsen Station
Taisha Line:  line between Kawato Station (on Kita-Matsue Line) and Izumo Taisha-mae Station

Rolling stock
 1000 series: 2-car EMUs converted from former Tokyu 1000 series cars
 2100 series: 2-car EMUs converted from former Keio 5000 series cars
 5000 series: 2-car EMUs converted from former Keio 5000 series cars
 7000 series: Single-car EMUs introduced on 11 December 2016

1000 series
In 2014, four former Tokyu 1000 series intermediate cars (1453, 1403, 1455, and 1405) were resold to the Ichibata Electric Railway, and reformed as two 2-car 1000 series sets with the addition of new cab ends. These entered service on 9 February 2015.

Formations

Car identities
The former identities of the fleet are as shown below.

7000 series

, two 7000 series cars (7001 and 7002) were in operation. While all cars carry the same basic livery of white with orange stripes on the upper and lower body, each car has a different theme and colouring on the ends and body sides.

Fleet details

Former rolling stock
 3000 series: 2-car EMUs converted from former Nankai 21000 series cars

The last 3000 series set was withdrawn following its final run on 22 January 2017, and scrapped in February 2017.

History

Kita Matsue Line
The  was founded on 6 April 1912. The line was extended to Ichibata Station (later closed) on 4 February 1915.

Electric trains began operating on the line from 1 October 1927, following electrification of the line at 1,500 V DC. The line was extended to the then-named  on 5 April 1928.

Driver-only operation commenced on 20 February 1997.

Taisha Line
The 8.3 km line from Kawato Station (on the Kita-Matsue Line) to Izumo Taisha-mae Station opened in 1930, following its electrification at 1,500 V DC.

See also
 Railways (2010 film), a 2010 Japanese film set on the Ichibata Railway

References

External links

 Ichibata Electric Railway (The holding company) 
 Ichibata Electric Railway (The railway company) 

 
Rail transport in Shimane Prefecture
Railway companies of Japan